Daurian may refer to:

 Transbaikal, a mountainous region in Russia, also known as Dauria
 Daurs, an ethnic group in the People's Republic of China